Friedrich Bolte (born 7 December 1896 in Schaapsen, Gemeinde Ochtmannien; died 23 November 1959 in Neubruchhausen, Landkreis Diepholz) was a German politician. He joined the Nazi Party (NSDAP) in 1933.

See also
List of Nazi Party members

References

1896 births
1959 deaths
Nazi Party politicians
Members of the Reichstag of Nazi Germany
German Army personnel of World War I